Eastlake High School is a school in unincorporated El Paso County, Texas, near Horizon City, Texas, United States, on the edge of El Paso. The school is in the Socorro Independent School District, and opened in 2010.

References

High schools in El Paso County, Texas
Socorro Independent School District high schools